Ingemar Walder (born 5 June 1978 in Sillian) is an Austrian snowboarder. He placed 29th in the men's parallel giant slalom event at the 2010 Winter Olympics.

References

1978 births
Living people
Austrian male snowboarders
Olympic snowboarders of Austria
Snowboarders at the 2010 Winter Olympics